Book of Abraham can refer to a number of texts:

 Book of Abraham, a Latter Day Saint religious text published by Joseph Smith
 The Book of Abraham (novel), a historical novel by Marek Halter
 The Book of Abramelin, a work of uncertain authorship
 Suhuf Ibrahim (The Scrolls of Abraham), a book of revelation mentioned in the Qu'ran in Chapter 87, verses 18 and 19
 Testament of Abraham, a pseudepigraphic book of the Old Testament
 A text alleged to have been used by alchemist Nicolas Flamel